The Cross of Merit was an award of Ukrainian Insurgent Army. It awarded for distinguished services to the state and people of the Ukrainian army. The Order was instituted on January 27, 1944 by the Ukrainian Supreme Liberation Council leaders, Roman Shukhevych and Dmytro Hrytsai.

The Order is awarded in five (golden, silver and bronze) grades and had a red ribbon with a black stripe on each edge.

Description

Knights 
 Nil Khasevych

References
Сергій Музичук, Ігор Марчук Українська Повстанча Армія. — Рівне: Бібліотека журналу «Однострій», 2006. — С. 35–46. — 56 с. — (Українські військові формування ХХ століття. Організація, уніформа, символіка). — . 
Віталій Манзуренко Бойові нагороди Української повстанської армії. — Львів: Український уніформологічний журнал “Однострій”, 2006. — 302 с.
Сергей Ткаченко Организация украинского повстанческо-партизанского движения в 40–50-ыe годы // Повстанческая армия: тактика борьбы / Под общей редакцией А. Е. Тараса. — Мн.: Харвест, 2000.

Ukrainian awards
Ukrainian Insurgent Army
Awards established in 1944